KKRQ (100.7 FM) is a classic rock station in the Cedar Rapids and Iowa City areas. Known as "100.7 The Fox," the station is operated by iHeartMedia and licensed to Iowa City, Iowa, with studios located in Cedar Rapids.

Music on "100.7 The Fox" includes hits from the 1960s through the 1990s, and uses the slogan "The Corridor's Classic Rock."

KKRQ broadcasts with a power of 100,000 watts, with transmitter and tower located outside its studios on the north side of Iowa City. Sister station KXIC (800 AM) is located in the same facility.

Classic hits and then classic rock (2010s-present)
At some point after 2010 KKRQ switched to a classic hits format with elements of classic rock (similar to WROR, Boston and WJJK, Indianapolis), playing a variety of music from the 1960s through to the 2000s. At night the station switched purely to classic rock with Sixx Sense with Nikki Sixx. In 2021, KKRQ dropped the classic hits portion of their playlist and segued into a full time classic rock format emphasizing the "Classic Rock" slogan.

External links

KRQ
Iowa City, Iowa
IHeartMedia radio stations